Little Ormside is a hamlet in the parish of Ormside, in the Eden District, in the English county of Cumbria. 


Location 
It is a few miles away from the small town of Appleby-in-Westmorland. It is near the River Eden. There is also the larger neighbouring village of Great Ormside.

See also

Listed buildings in Ormside

References

Little Ormside at Visit Cumbria website

Hamlets in Cumbria
Eden District